The following outline is provided as an overview of and topical guide to neuroscience:

Neuroscience is the scientific study of the structure and function of the nervous system. It encompasses the branch of biology that deals with the anatomy, biochemistry, molecular biology, and physiology of neurons and neural circuits. It also encompasses cognition, and human behavior. Neuroscience has multiple concepts that each relate to learning abilities and memory functions. Additionally, the brain is able to transmit signals that cause conscious/unconscious behaviors that are responses verbal or non-verbal. This allows people to communicate with one another.

Branches of neuroscience

Neurophysiology
Neurophysiology is the study of the function (as opposed to structure) of the nervous system.

 Brain mapping
 Electrophysiology
 Extracellular recording
 Intracellular recording
 Brain stimulation
 Electroencephalography
 Intermittent rhythmic delta activity
 :Category: Neurophysiology
 :Category: Neuroendocrinology
 :Neuroendocrinology

Neuroanatomy
Neuroanatomy is the study of the anatomy of nervous tissue and neural structures of the nervous system.

 Immunostaining
 :Category: Neuroanatomy

Neuropharmacology
Neuropharmacology is the study of how drugs affect cellular function in the nervous system.

 Drug
 Psychoactive drug
 Anaesthetic
 Narcotic

Behavioral neuroscience
Behavioral neuroscience, also known as biological psychology, biopsychology, or psychobiology, is the application of the principles of biology to the study of mental processes and behavior in human and non-human animals.

 Neuroethology

Developmental neuroscience
Developmental neuroscience aims to describe the cellular basis of brain development and to address the underlying mechanisms. The field draws on both neuroscience and developmental biology to provide insight into the cellular and molecular mechanisms by which complex nervous systems develop.

 Aging and memory

Cognitive neuroscience
Cognitive neuroscience is concerned with the scientific study of biological substrates underlying cognition, with a focus on the neural substrates of mental processes.

 Neurolinguistics
 Neuroimaging
 Functional magnetic resonance imaging
 Positron emission tomography

Systems neuroscience
Systems neuroscience is a subdiscipline of neuroscience which studies the function of neural circuits and systems. It is an umbrella term, encompassing a number of areas of study concerned with how nerve cells behave when connected together to form neural networks.

 Neural oscillation

Molecular neuroscience
Molecular neuroscience is a branch of neuroscience that examines the biology of the nervous system with molecular biology, molecular genetics, protein chemistry and related methodologies.

 Nutritional neuroscience
 Neurochemistry

Computational neuroscience
Computational neuroscience includes both the study of the information processing functions of the nervous system, and the use of digital computers to study the nervous system. It is an interdisciplinary science that links the diverse fields of neuroscience, cognitive science and psychology, electrical engineering, computer science, physics and mathematics.

 Neural network
 Neuroinformatic
 Neuroengineering
 Brain–computer interface
 Mathematical neuroscience

Neurophilosophy
Neurophilosophy or "philosophy of neuroscience" is the interdisciplinary study of neuroscience and philosophy. Work in this field is often separated into two distinct approaches. The first approach attempts to solve problems in philosophy of mind with empirical information from the neurosciences. The second approach attempts to clarify neuroscientific results using the conceptual rigor and methods of philosophy of science.

 Philosophy of mind
 Neuroethics
 Neuroscience of free will

Neurology
Neurology is the medical specialty dealing with disorders of the nervous system. It deals with the diagnosis and treatment of all categories of disease involving the central, peripheral, and autonomic nervous systems.

 Stroke
 Parkinson's disease
 Alzheimer's disease
 Huntington's disease
 Multiple sclerosis
 Amyotrophic lateral sclerosis
 Rabies
 Schizophrenia
 Epilepsy
 Hydrocephalus
 Brain damage
 Traumatic brain injury
 Closed head injury
 Coma
 Paralysis
 Level of consciousness
 Neurosurgery

Neuropsychology
Neuropsychology studies the structure and function of the brain related to psychological processes and behaviors. The term is used most frequently with reference to studies of the effects of brain damage in humans and animals.

 Agraphia
 Agnosia
 Alexia
 Amnesia
 Anosognosia
 Aphasia 
 Apraxia
 Dementia
 Dyslexia
 Hemispatial neglect
 Neurobiological effects of physical exercise

Neuroevolution and neuroeconomics

 Evolution of nervous systems
 Neuroevolution
 Noogenesis

History of neuroscience 
 History of neuroscience
 Neuron doctrine
 :Category: History of neuroscience

Nervous system

Outline of the human nervous system
 Action potential
 Acetylcholinesterase
 Central nervous system (CNS)
 Brain
 Dendrite
 Glial cells
 List of regions in the human brain
 Nervous system
 Neurite
 Neuron
 Neuroplasticity
 Synaptic plasticity
 Long-term potentiation
 Neurotransmitter
 Acetylcholine
 Dopamine
 Synapse

Neuroscience organizations

Persons influential in the field of neuroscience 
 List of neuroscientists
 :Category: Neuroscientists

Related sciences
 Genetics
 Neurochemistry
 Cognitive science
 Psychology
 Molecular biology
 Psychiatry
 Neurosurgery
 Linguistics
 Developmental biology
 Biotechnology
 Neurophilosophy

See also 

 Fundamentals of Neuroscience at Wikiversity

References

External links 

 
 Neuroscience Information Framework (NIF)
 
 American Society for Neurochemistry
 Neuroscience Online (electronic neuroscience textbook)
 Faculty for Undergraduate Neuroscience (FUN)
 Neuroscience for Kids
 Neuroscience Discussion Group in ResearchGate
 Neuroscience Discussion Forum
 HHMI Neuroscience lecture series - Making Your Mind: Molecules, Motion, and Memory

Neuroscience
 
Neuroscience
Neuroscience
Neuroscience